The Orașu Nou mine is a large mine in the northwest of Romania in Satu Mare County,  northeast of Satu Mare and  north of the capital, Bucharest.

References 

Bentonite mines in Romania